is a Japanese pair skater. With her former skating partner, Ryuichi Kihara, she is a two-time Asian Open Trophy medalist and the 2017 Japan national Champion. They have competed at the Four Continents Championships and on the Grand Prix series.

Career

Early years 
Suzaki began learning to skate in 2004. She placed 13th in ladies' singles at the 2013–14 Japan Junior Championships.

2015–2016 season 
Suzaki decided to compete in pairs in the 2015–2016 season. Her partnership with Ryuichi Kihara was announced in June 2015. In December, they received the bronze medal at the Japan Championships. They did not appear internationally in their first season together.

2016–2017 season 
After winning their first international medal (bronze) at the Asian Open Trophy in early August 2016 in Manila, Suzaki/Kihara took silver at the Japan Championships in December. Ranked twelfth in the short program and fourteenth in the free skate, they finished thirteenth overall at the 2017 Four Continents Championships, held in February in Gangneung, South Korea.

2017–2018 season 
Suzaki/Kihara began their season with silver at the Asian Open Trophy in August 2017. Making their Grand Prix debut, they finished eighth at the 2017 NHK Trophy in November.  They won their first national title at the 2017–18 Japan Championships, and were assigned to Japan's lone pairs spot at the 2018 Winter Olympics in PyeongChang. In February, they competed at the Olympics in both the team event and the individual event. They placed 21st in the latter and missed the free skate. They concluded their season at the 2018 World Championships, where they placed 24th, again missing the free skate.

2018–2019 season 
In October 2018, Suzaki/Kihara placed tenth at the 2018 CS Finlandia Trophy. They placed eighth at the 2018 Grand Prix Helsinki, their first Grand Prix event of the season. They also placed eighth at the 2018 NHK Trophy, their second assignment. They won a second national title at the 2018–19 Japan Championships. Due to a concussion sustained by Kihara in training, the pair withdrew from the 2019 Four Continents Championships and the home 2019 World Championships in Saitama. They announced the end of their partnership in early April 2019.

Programs 
(with Kihara)

Competitive highlights 
GP: Grand Prix; CS: Challenger Series

Pairs with Kihara

Ladies' singles

References

External links 
 

1999 births
Japanese female pair skaters
Living people
Figure skaters from Nagoya
Figure skaters at the 2018 Winter Olympics
Olympic figure skaters of Japan
Figure skaters at the 2017 Asian Winter Games